In car tuning culture, an engine swap is the process of removing a car's original engine and replacing it with another. This may be a like-for-like replacement, or to install a non-factory specification engine.

Typically an engine swap is performed for performance, swapping-in a more powerful engine; however, an engine swap may also be performed for maintenance, where older engines may have a shortage of spare parts, and so a modern replacement may be more easily and cheaply maintained.

Swapping the engine may have negative implications on the car's safety, performance, handling, and reliability. For example, the new engine's different weight balance over the axles and the overall weight of the car can adversely affect the vehicle dynamics. Existing brakes, transmission, and suspension components may be inadequate to handle the increased weight and power of the new engine with either upgrades being required or premature wear and failure being likely.

Insurance companies may charge more or even refuse to insure a vehicle that has been fitted with an engine that is different from its initial configuration. For instance, in jurisdictions such as California—with its strict, arbitrary smog rules—it may not be possible to register a late-model vehicle with an engine swap, even if it can be proven to produce less pollution than the original engine (owing to "visual inspection" rules).

Types of engine swaps 

Swapping to a diesel engine for improved fuel economy is a long established practice; with modern high-efficiency diesel engines, this does not necessarily mean a reduction in performance associated with older-version diesel engine swaps. For the particular application of off-road vehicles, the high torque at low speed of turbo diesels (combined with a fuel economy advantage) makes these conversions particularly effective. However, older non-electronic fuel injection diesel engines were well known for their reliability, especially in wet conditions.

An engine swap can either be to another engine intended to work in the car by the manufacturer, or one totally different. The former is much simpler than the latter. Fitting an engine into a car that was never intended to accept that engine may be more laborious and costly; modifying the car to fit the engine, modifying the engine to fit the car, and building custom engine mounts and transmission bellhousing adaptors to interface them along with a custom-built driveshaft. Some small businesses build conversion kits for engine swaps, such as the Fiat Twin cam into a Morris Minor or similar.

A common anecdote among tuners in the United States is that the easiest way to make a car faster is to drop in a more powerful engine, such as the General Motors small-block engine as used in the Corvette. The Chevrolet Vega (and its Astre, Monza, and Skyhawk sisters) is a candidate for a small-block swap; some have seen big blocks as well. Chevrolet engines have been used in such cars as Toyota Supras, BMWs, RX-7s, Mazda Miatas, Jaguar sedans, Corvairs, and Datsun 240s, 260s, and 280Zs.

In the Honda world, engine swaps include the Civic Si (B16A), the Civic Type R (B16B), Integra GSR (B18C), and the Integra Type R (B18C5) engines. More recently, swapping larger displacement Honda engines (such as the J-series V6) has become more popular. Swapping any of these motors into a lightweight 1988–2000 Honda Civic chassis can achieve greater performance.

Chrysler made many turbocharged vehicles in the 1980s, and these engines share much in common with the mass-produced naturally aspirated vehicles. It is quite common to obtain an engine from a vehicle such as a Dodge Daytona and swap it into a Dodge Aries. The Mopar Performance arm even offered a kit to upgrade the Dodge Daytona to rear wheel drive with a Mopar V8.

Engine swaps are also somewhat common within the Volkswagen tuning scene, often placing Type 2 (Bus), Type 3, and Type 4 (Squareback) engines in the Type 1 (Beetle). Water-cooled engines, such as the GTI 16-valve four, VR6, or 1.8 T are commonly swapped into the Mark II GTI, Jetta, and Corrado. Less common is the swap into a Mark 1 Golf or Cabriolet, giving an amazing power-to-weight ratio, even with minimally modified powerplants. Porsche engines are also very popular. One of the most popular options is to take the engine from a Porsche 911 super 1600. Vintage VW's also take very well to the Subaru EJ "flat four" engine, which also has a factory turbo-charged variant.

In the Super GT racing series, engine swaps can be considered a way of life for the upper tier GT500 cars, most of which are provided with specially modified racing engines from the manufacturers. GT500 class rules themselves allow for any engine to be swapped into a car as long as it is from the same manufacturer. Notable examples include Toyota swapping in highly tuned 4-cylinder engines originally from the Toyota Celica into their Toyota Supra GT500 race cars.

British sports cars (such as MGs and Triumphs and Sunbeam Alpines) from the late 1960s and early 1970s were attractive and light-weight cars that had excellent suspensions. However, they were known for troublesome electrical systems, modest power levels and a certain amount of unreliability. It is popular to take one of these small classic sports cars and add a more powerful engine. The original manufacturers did this when the vehicles were current with the MGB GT V8 and the Sunbeam Tiger. The all-aluminum  Buick and Oldsmobile V8 engines are a traditional choice for these cars. Power is approximately doubled. Derivatives of that classic General Motors engine, the 3.5L, 3.9L, and 4.2L Rover V8s are also frequently used. (The original Buick / Oldsmobile, the Rover, and the related Morgan-licensed V8, are simple bolt-ins.)

Although the more recent "narrow-angle" 60-degree Ford and GM V6 engines—notably the GM 3.4L "L32"—are more compact than the Rover/Buick and Ford V8s, they usually do not equal the power-to-weight ratio of the popular 90-degree V8s frequently swapped into smaller cars. These V6s can, however, be very cost-effective and easier to fit into a variety of car bodies.

The Ford 302 (5.0L) V8, with its cast iron block, results in spectacular power-to-weight ratios for straight-line acceleration. An aluminium 302 performance block is available that weighs 60 lb (27 kg) less than the common iron version, and can be found in displacements of 331 and 347 ci, but those are significantly more expensive than using the common 302 internals.

The Nissan SR20DET is an all-aluminium fuel-injected DOHC turbocharged 4-cylinder. This compact engine, along with the very compact, light, and powerful Mazda 13B rotary engine, have both been transplanted into too many different cars to assemble a complete list.

Common engine swaps 
Note: These are the most common examples and are not an exhaustive list, just a representative cross section.

See also 
 Bike-engined car
 Electric vehicle conversion

References

Further reading

 The Most Common Types of Replacement Engines
 S10 V8 Engine Swap
 The British V8 Newsletter.
 British Sports Cars Conversions and Modifications
 Volks-Swap - VW engine conversion message board
 Engine Swap Depot - Engine swap blog
 VW air-cooled to water-cooled conversions - Engine swap Forum
 JDM engines Engine Swap Resources
 The Foundation for California Community Colleges
 Engine Swap Tech - Engine swap forum
  - L67 engine swap page for various vehicles
 Toyota 3RZ-FE Swap and Knowledge - Toyota 3RZ-FE Swap and Knowledge
 Honda Swap Combinations - Definitive Honda Engine Swap Guide
 2JZGTE Wiring  - Guide to Wiring your 2JZGTE
 Nissan 240SX JDM RB25DET Swap Guide  - Swap a Skyline Engine into your Nissan
 VTEC Honda Swap Guide  - Wire VTEC into your Honda Swap
 240SX 2JZGTE Swap Guide  - Swap a Supra engine into your 240SX

Vehicle modifications